Canadian Tire Motorsport Park (formerly Mosport Park and Mosport International Raceway) is a multi-track motorsport venue located north of Bowmanville, in Ontario, Canada,  east of Toronto. The name "Mosport", a portmanteau of Motor Sport, came from the enterprise formed to build the track.

History

The circuit was the second purpose-built road race course in Canada after Westwood Motorsport Park in Coquitlam, British Columbia, succeeding Edenvale (Stayner, Ontario), Port Albert, Ontario's Green Acres (ex-British Commonwealth Air Training Plan), and Nanticoke, Ontario's Harewood Acres (ex-British Commonwealth Air Training Plan Number One Bombing and Gunnery School), all airport circuits, as Ontario racing venues.

The track was designed and built in the late 1950s. The first race to be held on the track was a local event organized by the Oakville Light Car Club in June 1961. Shortly thereafter, on June 25, the venue held its first major race, the Player's 200, a sports car race bringing drivers from the world over to rural Ontario. Stirling Moss won the two-heat event in a Lotus 19. Second was Joakim Bonnier with Olivier Gendebien third. The proposed hairpin was expanded into two discrete corners, to be of greater challenge to the drivers and more interesting for the spectators, at his suggestion, and is named Moss Corner in his honour. This is a source of lingering confusion as many people call the track Mossport. Unlike many historic motorsport venues, Mosport's track layout has remained mostly unchanged from its original form.

Drivers were consulted to ensure the character of the "old" track was kept; almost all the "racing lines" have been maintained.

Mosport achieved acclaim through a series of international sports car races under the title "Canadian Grand Prix" normally reserved for Formula 1 races.  Many events were wildly popular, breaking Canadian sports attendance records with each successive race.  The success of these races led Mosport to be seen as a key component in the founding of the Can Am Series.

The CanAm first visited the track in its inaugural season in 1966, and Mosport hosted at least one event in every year of the series' history, except 1968. In 1967, Canada's centennial year, Mosport hosted Formula One, USAC, and a 500cc Motorcycle Grand Prix. F1's Grand Prix of Canada remained at the track until 1977, until it was moved to Montreal.  Mosport has hosted a wide variety of series throughout its history. The circuit has held Formula One, USAC, World Sportscar Championship, Can-Am, Formula 5000, and many other sports car, open-wheel, and motorcycle series.

Mosport has had several fatalities, both track crew, drivers, and riders, the most recognized being German Formula One driver Manfred Winkelhock who was killed in 1985 when his Porsche 962C crashed into a concrete wall.  Another fatality at the track was in 2008 during the 29th annual Vintage Automobile Racing Association of Canada Racing Festival. Driver Dino Crescentini of Rochester Hills, MI – a ten-year veteran of vintage racing – lost control of his 1977 Wolf Dallara Can-Am car, which previously had been driven by Gilles Villeneuve. The most recent fatality was in 2018 when 61 year old former Pro Mazda driver Jeff Green speared off the racetrack at turn 8, and slammed into the barrier. He was attended to quickly but was unable to survive the crash.

Mosport has had a succession of owners since the original public company created to build the track. Two of those prior owners, Norm Namerow (who owned the track through his publishing company, CanTrack, until his death) and Harvey Hudes, have both been inducted into the Canadian Motorsport Hall of Fame for their contribution to the sport in Canada.  In 1998, Panoz Motorsports purchased the facility, and in 1999, the newly formed American Le Mans Series visited Mosport for the first time.

Canadian Motorsports Ventures Ltd. (CMV) which includes Orlando Corp. Chairman Carlo Fidani and Canadian road racing driver Ron Fellows, purchased the facility in June 2011.

In February 2012, a partnership between Mosport and Canadian Tire was announced. The partnership includes a renaming of the track to Canadian Tire Motorsport Park. The partnership will help to upgrade the facility, and improve the experience for spectators, participants, race teams, and corporate sponsors.

Driver Development Centre

In the spring of 2000, Mosport opened the Driver Development Centre, a second , 12 turn training circuit designed for driver development. The new course was designed by the owners and instructors of the Bridgestone Racing Academy and was designed specifically with fewer guard rails, walls and minimum blind corners to meet the needs of their driver and mechanic training program.

Due to significant scheduling demands on the original Grand Prix circuit, the original academy course was reconstructed and lengthened to a full racing course in the fall of 2013.  The new track features two configuration options; a  intermediate course, a  advanced course, as well as a skid pad, a pit lane, and a multi-storey event centre with classrooms and other facilities.

Prior to the Driver Development Centre, Mosport was home to the Bridgestone Racing Academy from 2000 to 2019, which conducted corporate programs, racing schools, and a Mechanics Training Program. The academy itself was originally established at Shannonville Motorsport Park, when owners Charlie and Brett Goodman acquired the cars and equipment of the former Spenard-David Racing School and teamed with then-Bridgestone/Firestone Canada Inc.

Mosport Speedway

Mosport Speedway was a  oval speedway located on the northwest corner of Canadian Tire Motorsport Park. The track featured  straightaways, 6-degree banked corners and two grandstands with seating for 8,500.

The oval was constructed in 1989 as a dirt track originally called Mosport's Ascot North, named after the famous Ascot Park track in Gardena, California.  The first event was scheduled in July 1989 and was to feature USAC Midgets and Sprint Cars and the World of Outlaws.  The races were cancelled after the initial heat races caused deep ruts in the corners and dislodging stones hidden under the clay.

The track was paved that summer and renamed Mosport International Speedway. The track hosted a weekly Saturday night stock car racing program from May to September for 24 years.  The stock car divisions included pure stock, sportsman and late models.  The oval also featured regular touring series including the ACT Series, ISMA Supermodifieds, OSCAAR, Lucas Oil Sportsman Cup, CASCAR Super Series and the NASCAR Canadian Tire Series.

The park announced the closing of the oval in July 2013 to accommodate the expansion of the Driver Development Centre.

Current series

IMSA WeatherTech SportsCar Championship

It was announced in September 2013 that Canadian Tire Motorsports Park was chosen to host an annual round of the IMSA United SportsCar Championship beginning in 2014. The new series replaced the American Le Mans Series as the feature race during the tracks annual SportsCar Grand Prix, which is Canada's largest annual sportscar race.

NASCAR Truck Series

The NASCAR Camping World Truck Series began racing at Canadian Tire Motorsport Park in September 2013, marking the first time the series has raced in Canada. Chevrolet was announced as the title sponsor and the race is known as the Chevrolet Silverado 250.

NASCAR Pinty's Series

The NASCAR Pinty's Series has visited the facility at least twice annually every year since its inaugural season in 2007. Currently the race is known as the Clarington 200 and takes place during the tracks Victoria Day SpeedFest Weekend and its Chevrolet Silverado 250 weekend.

Other series

IMSA Michelin Pilot Challenge
IMSA VP Racing SportsCar Challenge
Canadian Superbike Championship
Sports Car Championship Canada
Radical Cup Canada
Nissan Sentra Cup
Toyo Tires F1600 Championship
VARAC Vintage Grand Prix
Canadian Sport Compact Series
Ontario Time Attack Series 

The track also hosts vintage racing series, motorcycle racing, and Canadian Automobile Sport Club (CASC) amateur events and lapping days.

Photo gallery

Lap records

The unofficial fastest ever recorded lap was taken by Rinaldo Capello, in an Audi R10 TDI, in qualifying for the 2008 Grand Prix of Mosport, with a time of 1:04.094. The official lap record was set in the race for that meeting with Capello's Audi Sport North America teammate Marco Werner lapping in a time of 1:05.823.

The fastest official race lap records at Canadian Tire Motorsport Park (Mosport) for different classes are listed as:

Former series and major race winners

FIA Formula One World Championship

FIA World Sportscar Championship

USAC Championship Car (IndyCar)

FIM Road Racing World Championship

FIM Formula 750 World Championship

FIM World Superbike Championship

FIM Motocross World Championship

American Le Mans Series

IMSA GT Championship

SCCA Trans-Am Series

Canadian Sports Car Championship

USAC Stock Car

SCCA Can-Am Series

SCCA Formula 5000

Atlantic Championship

Formula Super Vee Championship

CASCAR Super Series

ASA National Tour

USAC National Sprint Car Series

Music events
Mosport has also been the venue of a number of concerts and music festivals such as:
Strawberry Fields Festival, August 7–9, 1970
Canada Jam, August 26, 1978
Heatwave Festival, August 23, 1980
Edenfest, July 12–14, 1996
Boots and Hearts Music Festival, August 10–12, 2012, August 2–4, 2013, July 31 – August 3, 2014

See also
List of auto racing tracks in Canada

References

External links

Official Site

Kart Complex
NASCAR Track Page
Regional racing information
Canadian Historic Grand Prix

Road racing venues in Canada
Motorsport venues in Ontario
Paved oval racing venues in Ontario
Motorsport in Canada
Formula One circuits
Grand Prix motorcycle circuits
Superbike World Championship circuits
Canadian Grand Prix
American Le Mans Series circuits
IMSA GT Championship circuits
NASCAR tracks
Buildings and structures in Clarington
Tourist attractions in the Regional Municipality of Durham
Canadian Tire
Music venues in Ontario
1961 establishments in Ontario
Sports venues completed in 1961
Festival venues in Canada